The IntET(Canada) designation is a professional title awarded on the basis of academic qualification and work experience.  It is a certification recognized over provincial borders and over some national borders. The Canadian Council of Technicians and Technologists offers this certification.

The IntET(Canada) designation is recognized and protected in Australia, Canada, Hong Kong, Ireland, New Zealand, South Africa and the United Kingdom.

To qualify for this certification, a technologist must:
 be a Certified Engineering Technologist in Canada
 have a minimum of seven years practical work experience
 have a minimum of two years in a management or supervisory role
 agree to be bound by an international Code of Ethics
 demonstrate professional development activities for the past 5 years

References

Professional titles and certifications
Professional certification in engineering